Dead Water is a 2019 American thriller film directed by Chris Helton and starring Casper Van Dien and Judd Nelson.

Plot
Married couple Vivian and David Cooper are talking about their vacation being something go for them three weeks prior leading up to. David Cooper a retired marine and his brother's best friend John are at the bar talking about what is going on in David's life at the time. When they overhear a few guys insulting his wife who was reporting the news on TV. After fighting the two men David and John leave the bar. John invites David who they refer to as Coop and his wife on a trip to retrieve his paid for yacht in the virgin islands. John mentions to David that he needs to talk to a therapist about what is happening to him and he shrugs it off with no concern on top of putting his daily dose of pills in the sink. Vivian returns home from work and talks about how John called her about the vacation and suggests that they go and need this time. Later that night David tells Vivian that they can go on the trip. Arriving at the boat John talks to the couple about touring the boat before they leave the dock.

Suspect at Johns advances at Vivian he pays attention to John a little closer. They talk about David's brother and the memories. John leaves the couple to go for a smoke and David mentions that John seems off. Things get tensed with the guy because John continually asking about the war. John apologizes after David tells him that he doesn't like to talk about it. Vivian goes to find rum in John's room and finds a picture of her and John with David torn off the picture.

John starts to reveal disturbing behavior along with David. While David and John are swimming; there is a guy by the name of Jack covering his bleeding eye sees their boat across the water.

David finds the picture that Vivian found earlier. He suggested that they play truth or dare and John ask him how many people has he killed. 
Coop decided that he wanted to ask his question or make his request to the two. He suggested that Vivian and John kiss. They both declined. Walking up from the night they had Coop finds John in the command room and is told the boat stop working. David decides to go look for help and he runs into Jack. After being shot by Jack; Coop is laying in the water and Jack heads to Johns boat. Back at the boat John confesses his love for Vivian but she declines his advances. Jack comes to Johns boat saying that he can help with a fee given. John agrees.

Vivian continues to call David's phone looking for him and she realizes that Jack has her husband phone. So Jack takes Vivian inside the yacht and drives off leaving John in Jacks boat. Finding John on the boat and telling  David that Jack killed and took Vivian so David tries to hotwire the boat and he goes after them.

Cast
Casper Van Dien as John Livingston
Judd Nelson as Sam McLean
Brianne Davis as Vivian Cooper
Griff Furst as David Cooper
Chris Helton as Jack

Release
The film was released in theaters and VOD on July 26, 2019.

Reception
Jake Dee of JoBlo.com gave the film a five out of ten, while on Metacritic, Dead Water have a 31 out of a 100 rank based on 4 critical reviews, indicating "generally unfavorable reviews".

Joe Leydon of Variety gave the film a negative review and described it as "a tepid VOD-ready melodrama that strikes faint echoes of Roman Polanski's Knife in the Water and Phillip Noyce's Dead Calm while ponderously padding 60 or so minutes of plot to feature length".

Frank Scheck of The Hollywood Reporter also gave the film a negative review and wrote, "None of the performers are able to bring life to their schematic characters, although Nelson appears to be having fun as a modern-day pirate".

References

External links

American thriller films
2019 thriller films
Saban Films films
2010s English-language films
2010s American films